The Party Line is a British radio sitcom, co-written by Steve Punt and Hugh Dennis, and produced by Adam Bromley. It was originally broadcast on BBC Radio 4 between 2005 and 2008. The show stars James Fleet as Duncan Stonebridge, a Labour  Member of Parliament for the imaginary Rothershurst, which appears to be a marginal constituency in the north of England, one which was traditionally Conservative but turned Labour under Tony Blair. In line with the national trend, the elections of 2005 saw Stonebridge's majority reduced to 27. Stonebridge is a Londoner and, according to his constituency agent Roger (Geoffrey McGivern), was "parachuted in by RAF Millbank".

Plot

The show follows the everyday life of the MP. Each episode begins and concludes with Stonebridge travelling on the train from London, and a short, witty dialogue between Stonebridge and a railway attendant. Most episodes then revolve around Stonebridge's attempt to gain publicity in his constituency, ultimately being thwarted by an unlikely twist of fate or bad luck. Stonebridge finds it difficult to fill the shoes of his predecessor, Sir Digby, whose name still looms large in the shape of his widow, Lady Harriet (Geraldine McNulty). In the third series, Harriet becomes Duncan's constituency secretary. He also struggles to keep one step ahead of Angela, his image-conscious and media savvy Conservative rival. It is an ongoing joke that he is secretly attracted to Angela.

The middle of each show features Stonebridge's constituency surgery, dealing with problems from constituents of variable sanity, including Mrs Digweed, who insists the constituency needs a badger tunnel, and doesn't believe he's doing enough to get this discussed in Parliament.

Other characters include Jane (Rachel Atkins), Duncan's long-suffering sister, and the other members of the constituency team, the aggressive Ruth and the geeky Neil. Various characters are played by Simon Greenall, Beth Chalmers, Manjit Mann and Dan Mersh.

Productions

The show was typically written and produced only 24 hours before it was broadcast, so it sometimes contained references to current events.

External links

BBC Radio comedy programmes
BBC Radio 4 programmes
2005 radio programme debuts